Drillia collina is a species of sea snail, a marine gastropod mollusk in the family Drilliidae.

Description
The length of the shell attains 7 mm, its diameter 3 mm.

Distribution
This species occurs in the Indian Ocean off East London, South Africa at a depth of 58 m.

References

  Barnard K.H. (1958), Contribution to the knowledge of South African marine Mollusca. Part 1. Gastropoda; Prosobranchiata: Toxoglossa; Annals of The South African Museum v. 44 p. 73 - 163
  Tucker, J.K. 2004 Catalog of recent and fossil turrids (Mollusca: Gastropoda). Zootaxa 682:1–1295

Endemic fauna of South Africa
collina
Gastropods described in 1958